McCutcheon may refer to:

People
 Allan L. McCutcheon (1950–2016), American sociologist and statistician
 Andrew McCutcheon (born 1931), Australian politician and Attorney-General of Victoria 
 Bill McCutcheon (1924–2002), American actor
Brian McCutcheon (politician) (born 1967), Progressive Conservative Party candidate in the 1997 Canadian federal election
Brian McCutcheon (ice hockey) (born 1949), Canadian ice hockey player
 Darwin McCutcheon (born 1962), Canadian ice hockey defenceman
 Daylon McCutcheon (born 1976), American college football player, son of Lawrence McCutcheon
 Gary McCutcheon (born 1978), Scottish footballer
 George Barr McCutcheon (1866–1928), playwright
 Gillian McCutcheon, British actress
 Hugh McCutcheon, volleyball coach
 Ian McCutcheon (born 1959),American neurosurgeon
 John McCutcheon (born 1952), American folk singer
 John McCutcheon (New Jersey politician) (1879–1942), New Jersey State Comptroller
 John T. McCutcheon (1870–1949), American political cartoonist
 Keith B. McCutcheon (1915–1971), U.S. Marine Corps aviator and general
 Lance McCutcheon (born 1999), American football player
 Lawrence McCutcheon (born 1950), American football player
 Mac McCutcheon (Canadian politician) (1912–1978), Canadian politician and farmer
 Mac McCutcheon (Alabama politician), member of the Alabama House of Representatives
 Malcolm Wallace McCutcheon known as "Wallace" (1906–1969), a Canadian politician
 Mark McCutcheon (born 1984), American ice hockey player
 Martine McCutcheon (born 1976), English actress and singer
 Pat McCutcheon (born 1987),  Australian rugby union footballer
 Robert McCutcheon (1841–1918), Australian politician
 Rodney McCutcheon (born 1962), Irish bowler
 Russell T. McCutcheon, Canadian scholar
 Sandy McCutcheon, Australian author
 Shaun McCutcheon, American businessman and Republican activist, plaintiff of McCutcheon v. FEC
 Shaw McCutcheon (1921–2016), American cartoonist
 Stuart McCutcheon (–2023), New Zealand university administrator
 Wallace McCutcheon, Sr. (1858 or 1862 – 1918), American pioneer cinematographer and director
 William McCutcheon (1870–1949), Wales international rugby player
 William W. McCutcheon (1926–2020), American police chief and politician

Fictional characters
 Shane McCutcheon, fictional character on The L Word
 Admiral McCutcheon, fictional character in the 1997 television remake of 20,000 Leagues Under the Sea

Places
United States
 McCutcheon, Mississippi
 McCutcheon High School in Lafayette, Indiana

See also
 McCutcheon v. Federal Election Commission
 McCutcheon index measure of bacteria
Multiple Access Ltd. v. McCutcheon, a lawsuit
 A variation of the French Defence opening, in chess
 McCutchen a similarly spelled surname
 McCutchan
 MacCutchen, a fictional brand of scotch whiskey, featured in the series Lost.